Bomb Factory is a Japanese band with styles that originated in heavy metal and punk rock music during the early 1990s and later developed into the hardcore punk and melodic hardcore sound found on most studio releases. The band was formed in 1991 and remains active to this day. Since the formation, Bomb Factory has released a substantial amount of material and has become widely known throughout Japan. In the United States and Europe, Bomb Factory gained initial popularity with the inclusion of the theme track "Exciter" on Tecmo's Dead or Alive 2 video game. The 2008 release of the Moshing Through Tokyo compilation album further promoted the band's material outside Japan. The most recent release of Closed upholds the same musical styles characteristic of the band.



Albums

Studio albums

Mini-albums

Compilation albums

Maxi singles

Split singles

Other appearances

Videos

Video albums

Music videos

References

External links 
 

Punk rock group discographies
Discographies of Japanese artists